Metford is a suburb of the city of Maitland, New South Wales, Australia. It is on the New England Highway and has a railway station on NSW TrainLink's Hunter line.  The line was opened in 1857, and the station was opened on 17 March 1995.

Education 
There are two main schools in Metford, one being Metford Public School, a co-ed government primary school., and Maitland Christian School, a co-ed Baptist K-12 school.

Heritage Listings 
Metford has some heritage listings, including:
 Main Northern Railway: Metford railway station
 McCubbin Close: Metford Skate Park

References

Suburbs of Maitland, New South Wales